The St. Louis metropolitan area has a history of tornadoes. The third-deadliest, and the costliest in United States history, the 1896 St. Louis–East St. Louis tornado, injured more than one thousand people and caused at least 255 fatalities in the City of St. Louis and in East St. Louis. The second-costliest tornado also occurred in St. Louis in September 1927. More tornado fatalities occurred in St. Louis than any other city in the United States. Also noteworthy is that destructive tornadoes occurred in winter and autumn, as well as the typical months of spring. Additionally, damaging tornadoes occurred in the morning and late at night, as well as the more common late-afternoon to early-evening maximum period.

In April 2011, an EF4 tornado on Good Friday caused widespread damage along a  track across the northern part of the St. Louis metropolitan area; including significant damage to Lambert International Airport, causing a complete shutdown for over 24 hours, but no deaths. Prior to that event, a F4 tornado also struck the northern metro, and killed three in January 1967. Another F4 tornado struck the Granite City and Edwardsville, Illinois area in April 1981.

City of St. Louis tornadoes

Greater St. Louis-area tornadoes 
These tables describe the tornado history for Greater St. Louis. In Missouri, this includes the counties of St. Louis, St. Charles, Franklin, and Jefferson. In Illinois, this includes the counties of Madison, St. Clair, and Monroe. Data for the independent city of St. Louis is not part of these tables unless part of the path of the tornado striking these counties also struck the city.

1870–1950

1950s

1960–1980

1980–2000

2000—present

See also 
 List of tornadoes and tornado outbreaks
 List of North American tornadoes and tornado outbreaks
 List of tornado-related deaths at schools
 List of tornadoes striking downtown areas
 Tri-State Hailstorm of April 2001 (NWS summary)
 July 2006 derechoes (NWS summary)

References 

 
 
 National Climatic Data Center: Storm Events Database and Storm Data

External links 
 National Weather Service St. Louis Tornado Climatology
 
 
 

History of St. Louis
History of St. Louis County, Missouri
Tornadoes in Missouri